Adolf Fischer (23 July 1893 – 23 October 1947) was a general in the Wehrmacht of Nazi Germany during World War II.  He was a recipient of the Knight's Cross of the Iron Cross. Fischer surrendered to the Yugoslavian troops in May 1945. He was charged with war crimes, convicted and executed on the 23rd of October, 1947.

Awards and decorations

 Knight's Cross of the Iron Cross on 4 May 1944 as Oberst and commander of Grenadier-Regiment 459

Notes

References

 

1893 births
1947 deaths
People from Schwerte
People from the Province of Westphalia
Major generals of the German Army (Wehrmacht)
German Army personnel of World War I
German police officers
Recipients of the clasp to the Iron Cross, 1st class
Recipients of the Gold German Cross
Recipients of the Knight's Cross of the Iron Cross
German prisoners of war in World War II
Executed people from North Rhine-Westphalia
Executed military leaders
Nazis executed by Yugoslavia by hanging
Military personnel from North Rhine-Westphalia